The Villa Loredan at Carbonera, also known as Villa Loredan Valier Perocco, is a 17th-century aristocratic villa located in Vascon, a district of Carbonera in the northern Italian region of Veneto.

History 
The villa was first mentioned in 1688 when construction was started through a commission of Giovanni Loredan, a Venetian nobleman of the Loredan family. The villa was enriched by the Loredan brothers Antonio and Alvise. After having been a property of the family for two centuries, the villa changed ownership several times toward the end of the 19th century, and then, from 1867 to 1940, it belonged to the noble Valier family, also of Venice. After a period of decline, the villa was purchased in 1951 by the Perocco di Meduna family, who renovated it and still own it today. The villa is not open to the public.

Description 
The villa consists of a monumental central block flanked horizontally by two porticoed barchesse, intended to house the servants, which are arranged in an entirely symmetrical position. At its centre, the façade contains four Ionic semicolumns and a triangular tympanum; this neo-Palladian motif is presumably an 18th-century addition, as are the sections which connect the main block to the two barchesse. Inside, on the upper floor, there is a spectacular double-height hall with balconies at the ends, entirely frescoed by the Venetian painters Gerolamo Brusaferro and Niccolò Bambini, and by perspective painters probably from Emilia. These were commissioned around 1720 by the Loredan owners. The frescoes contain extraordinary depictions of episodes of ancient Roman history, and the ensemble is certainly one of the greatest examples of Baroque pictorial decoration in the Veneto. Very remarkable is the original architecture of the public/private oratory, dedicated to the Madonna of Loreto, detached from the villa and facing the front road. The oratory has a circular plan with a united triple apse presbytery.

The overall architectural effect of the villa, which is predominantly horizontal, fits well into the flat countryside of the March of Treviso.

Gallery

Bibliography 

 F. Monicelli, S. Montagner, Guida alle ville venete, Demetra, Verona, 2000.

References 

Villas in Veneto